The Georgian Hotel is a historic building in Santa Monica, California, in the United States.

See also 

 List of City of Santa Monica Designated Historic Landmarks

References 

Buildings and structures in Santa Monica, California